"1001 Arabian Nights" is a song by Dutch band Ch!pz, from their 2005 album The World of Ch!pz. The song remained at number one on the Dutch singles chart for four weeks. It reached number two in Austria, and number three in Germany and Switzerland.

In November 2022, the song received renewed attention as a result of a TikTok trend.

Music video
Filmed on location in India, the band travel to a Middle Eastern city where a magic lamp has been stolen by a thief who wished to become the richest man in the world. They battle the bodyguards finding the thief, and while Rachel and Cilla distract the thief that just turned a jester into a goat (who has wished to become the world's richest man) by dancing for him, Kevin and Peter steal the lamp and the band escapes. The city is then restored with the return of the lamp and the thief is arrested and been put away by the locals while the band bid farewell to the people.

Viral on TikTok
In November 2022, Ch!pz went worldwide viral on TikTok with the song 1001 Arabian Nights. The song originally released in 2004 appeared in several videos on TikTok in October 2022 in which people performed a new dance to the song, in response to this, the pop group posted a video on 19 November 2022 on their account in which they performed the old and new dance to the song. They then went worldwide viral; their video was viewed more than 15 million times in nine days, and more than 2.6 million new videos with their song were posted on the platform in eleven days. This brought a revival of the song and it reached the top spot on the Viral charts on Spotify in Australia, Austria, Singapore, Sweden, Denmark, Finland and Poland.

Charts

Weekly charts

Year-end charts

Decade-end charts

Certifications

References

2005 songs
2006 singles
Ch!pz songs
Dutch Top 40 number-one singles
Songs written by Allan Eshuijs
Songs written by Tony Cornelissen